Samyukta Socialist Party (SSP), was a political party in India from 1964 to 1972.  SSP was formed through a split in the Praja Socialist Party (PSP) in 1964. In 1965, Ram Manohar Lohia merged his Socialist Party (Lohia) with SSP and contested in 1967 Indian general election. In 1972, SSP was reunited with PSP, forming the Socialist Party. But in December 1972, SSP was recreated after the split in Socialist Party. One faction of SSP led by Madhu Limaye and George Fernandes wanted to merge with PSP but another faction led by Raj Narain resisted the merger with PSP.

The General Secretary of the SSP from 1969 to 1971 was George Fernandes.

The Party President of the SSP from 1964 to 1971 was Anantram Jaiswal.

The SSP merged with Charan Singh's Bharatiya Kranti Dal, Swatantra Party and Utkal Congress to form Bharatiya Lok Dal

See also 

 List of political parties in India

References 

 

Political parties established in 1964
Defunct socialist parties in India
Political parties disestablished in 1972
Political parties in India